Era Quhila is a reservoir located in the Inderta woreda of the Tigray Region in Ethiopia. The earthen dam that holds the reservoir was built in 1997 by the Tigray Bureau of Agriculture and Natural Resources.

Dam characteristics 
 Dam crest length: 180 metres
 Spillway width: 15 metres
 Original capacity: 1 185 000 m³

Irrigation 
 Designed irrigated area: 87 ha
 Actual irrigated area in 2002: 25 ha

Environment 
The catchment of the reservoir is 12.86 km² large, with a perimeter of 14 km and a length of 4550 metres. The reservoir suffers from rapid siltation. The lithology of the catchment is Agula Shale and a bit of Mekelle Dolerite. Part of the water that could be used for irrigation is lost through seepage; the positive side-effect is that this contributes to groundwater recharge.

References 

Reservoirs in Ethiopia
1997 establishments in Ethiopia
Tigray Region